Neil Taylor (born 26 January 1961) is an English guitarist, best known for his long-time affiliation with Robbie Williams and for formerly being a member of Tears for Fears.

Career
Taylor started playing in local bands in his youth before joining Neon as a session musician in the early 1980s. During this time he met Curt Smith and Roland Orzabal who, after founding Tears for Fears, asked Taylor to tour with them and play guitar tracks for their second album, Songs from the Big Chair (1985), and their third The Seeds of Love (1989). Taylor toured with the band several times between 1983 and 1990 and appears on their live concert videos In My Mind's Eye (1984) and Going to California. 
In 1985, He released the first and only album titled You've Got to Stay Young with his former band Violent Blue under Magnet Records. (1990). In the 1990s, he went on to play with several artists before becoming a regular member of Robbie Williams' band in 2003. Taylor has played guitar for many artists including Tina Turner, Howard Jones, Chris de Burgh, Natalie Imbruglia and James Morrison.

Solo
In 2011, Taylor released his first solo album, No Self Control, and toured Germany assisted by Gary Nuttal. In April 2012, he released his second album Chasing Butterflies.

Discography
Tears for Fears - Songs from the Big Chair (1985)
Red Box - The Circle & The Square (1986)
Climie Fisher - Everything (1987)
Jane Wiedlin - Fur (1988)
Holly Johnson - Blast (1989)
Tina Turner - Foreign Affair (1989)
Morrissey - "The Last of the Famous International Playboys" (1989)
Tears for Fears - The Seeds of Love (1989)
Easterhouse - Waiting for the Redbird (1989)
Propaganda - 1234 (1990)
Tina Turner - Simply the Best (1991)
Howard Jones - In the Running (1992)
Simon Climie - Soul Inspiration (1992)
The Beloved - Conscience (1993)
Wendy James - Now Ain't the Time for Your Tears (1993)
Chris de Burgh - This Way Up (1994)
Heather Nova - Siren (1998)
Robbie Williams - Sing When You're Winning (2000)
Natalie Imbruglia - White Lilies Island (2001)
Naked Eyes - Everything and More (2001)
Nick Carter - "Help Me" (2002)
Robbie Williams - Escapology (2002)
Brian McFadden - "Real to Me" (2004)
Natalie Imbruglia - Counting Down the Days (2005)
Robbie Williams - Intensive Care (2005)
James Morrison - Undiscovered (2006)
Robbie Williams - Rudebox (2006)
Neil Taylor - No Self Control (2011)
Neil Taylor - Chasing Butterflies (2012)
Neil Taylor - No God Like Rock 'n' Roll (2013)
Robbie Williams - Under the Radar Volume 1 (2014)
Neil Taylor - Silverwing (2015)
Robbie Williams - Under the Radar Volume 2 (2017)

References

External links
Official Neil Taylor website
Official Facebook page
Neil Taylor discography at CD Universe

1961 births
Living people
English rock guitarists
English male guitarists
English session musicians
Musicians from Bristol
Place of birth missing (living people)
Tears for Fears members
Robbie Williams Band members
Neon (British band) members